Shults is an East Slavic spelling of the German surname Schulz. Notable people with the surname include:

Genrikh Shults (1929–1999), Russian judoka and sambo practitioner
Kostyantyn Shults (born 1993), Ukrainian football player
Marina Shults (born 1994), Israeli group rhythmic gymnast
Tammie Jo Shults (born 1962), American pilot
Trey Edward Shults (born 1988), American film director

See also

East Slavic-language surnames
Surnames of German origin